M145 may refer to:

 M-145, a Michigan state trunkline highway
 M145 Machine Gun Optic